Dear Love is the third studio album by Canadian singer-songwriter Suzie McNeil, released on July 24, 2012 through 604 Records. It has spawned four singles, including the top 10 Canada AC hit "Merry Go Round" and the Faber Drive duet "Love Can't Save Us Now". According to McNeil, the album "tells the story of [her] journey into love [and] loss," and lyrically, the songs revolve around the themes of heartbreak and recovery.

Critical reception
The Calgary Herald's review gave the album three stars out of five, with critic Eric Volmers explaining that "Dear Love works because it has all of the trappings of a shameless, radio-grabbing pop album. Immaculate production, airplay-friendly hooks, semi-cool ’80s cover (The Eurythmics’ Here Comes the Rain Again) and even some celeb musical guests... is the formula here." On McNeil herself, Volmers elaborated that she "has a powerful voice and a nice way of surrounding her hooks with memorable melodies."

In a similar vein, Real Style Network's review felt that "on paper, [McNeil] has everything you need, but there is something missing on the album. It is well done, but forgettable." Despite indicating that McNeil was "playing it safe" on the album, the review praised her "versatile" vocals which "[allow] her to be sweet as sugar or edgy and tough," and deemed the song's generally "catchy, sometimes being reminiscent of a more subtle Katy Perry."

Track listing

Chart performance

Singles

Release history

References

2012 albums
604 Records albums
Suzie McNeil albums